The Swedish PGA Championship for women is a golf tournament played annually in Sweden since 1997. It has been an event on the Swedish Golf Tour since inception and featured on the LET Access Series since 2012.

A corresponding Swedish PGA Championship for men has been played since 1970.

There is also a Swedish club pro PGA championship, limited to club professionals in Sweden, with separate competitions for men, women and senior men categories.

Winners 

(a) denotes amateur

See also
Swedish PGA Championship (men)
List of sporting events in Sweden

References

External links
PGA of Sweden
Ahlsell Nordic Golf Tour

LET Access Series events
Swedish Golf Tour (women) events
Golf tournaments in Sweden
Recurring sporting events established in 1997
1997 establishments in Sweden